Zachełmie  is a village in the administrative district of Gmina Zagnańsk, within Kielce County, Świętokrzyskie Voivodeship, in south-central Poland.

The village has a population of 568.

Zachełmie Quarry

  
A former limestone quarry is located near the village. The rocks are part of the Świętokrzyskie (Holy Cross) Mountains, once on the southern coast of Laurasia, and have yielded 395-million-year-old fossil footprints of tetrapods. These are believed to be the oldest tracks of four-legged animals known to palaeontologists, pushing back their estimated evolution by more than 18 million years. The finding also suggests that the first vertebrates to walk on land may have evolved in marine tidal flats or lagoons, likely dining on animals washed up with the tides, rather than in freshwater habitats.

References

Villages in Kielce County